The 2019 CAF Champions League Final was the final of the 2018–19 CAF Champions League, the 55th edition of Africa's premier club football tournament organized by the Confederation of African Football (CAF), and the 23rd edition under the current CAF Champions League title.

The final was originally contested in two-legged home-and-away format between Wydad AC from Morocco and defending champions Espérance de Tunis from Tunisia. The first leg was hosted by Wydad AC at the Prince Moulay Abdellah Stadium in Rabat on 24 May 2019, while the second leg was hosted by Espérance de Tunis at the Stade Olympique de Radès in Tunis on 31 May 2019.

Espérance de Tunis were initially declared winners following a refusal by Wydad AC to resume play following an issue with VAR, though CAF later ruled the second leg must be replayed in a neutral venue to decide the champions. However, the decision to order a replay was thrown out by the Court of Arbitration for Sport (CAS), who told the Confederation of African Football (CAF) to refer the case to its proper disciplinary structures for a decision, and on 7 August 2019, Espérance de Tunis were declared winners for a second time. As winners, they earned the right to play in the 2020 CAF Super Cup and the 2019 FIFA Club World Cup.

Teams
In the following table, finals until 1996 were in the African Cup of Champions Club era, since 1997 were in the CAF Champions League era.

Venues

Road to the final

Note: In all results below, the score of the finalist is given first (H: home; A: away).

Format
The final was played on a home-and-away two-legged basis, with the order of legs determined by the knockout stage draw, which was held on 20 March 2019, 20:00 CAT (UTC+2), at the Marriot Hotel in Cairo, Egypt.

If the aggregate score was tied after the second leg, the away goals rule would have been applied, and if still tied, extra time would not have been played, and a penalty shoot-out would have been used to determine the winner.

Matches

First leg

Second leg

See also
2019 CAF Confederation Cup Final
2020 CAF Super Cup

Notes

References

External links
Total CAF Champions League 2018/2019, CAFonline.com

2019
Final
May 2019 sports events in Africa
Wydad AC matches
2018–19 in Moroccan football
2018–19 in Tunisian football
Sport in Rabat
Sports competitions in Radès
21st century in Rabat
21st century in Radès
International club association football competitions hosted by Morocco
International club association football competitions hosted by Tunisia
Association football controversies